The County of Fortescue is a county (a cadastral division) in Central Queensland, Queensland, Australia. Much of its area is within the Barakula State Forest. It was named and bounded by the Governor in Council on 7 March 1901 under the Land Act 1897.

Parishes
Fortescue is divided into parishes, as listed below:

References

External links 

 

 

Fortescue